Gabrielle Graham is a Canadian actress. She first appeared in the Amazon Prime series The Expanse (2017). Later that year, she went on to star as recurring role Fatima Gossa in the Netflix series 21 Thunder. She continued appearing in various films and television series, most notably in films as Parker in On the Basis of Sex (2018) and as Tabitha in In the Shadow of the Moon (2019).

Career

She had her breakthrough starring as main role Nia in the series Twenties (2020–present). That same year she also appeared in the sci-fi horror film Possessor (2020) as Holly, where she opened the film, and for which her performance was critically praised.

She attended York University for acting and graduated in 2015.

Filmography

Film

Television

References

External links
 
 Gabrielle Graham on Instagram

Canadian television actresses
Canadian film actresses
York University alumni
Black Canadian actresses
Living people
21st-century Canadian actresses
Year of birth missing (living people)